John Seva Hunt (February 17, 1920June 21, 1991) was an American football fullback/halfback.  He was elected to the College Football Hall of Fame in 2004. He played with the Marshall Thundering Herd, and later played professionally with the Chicago Bears of the National Football League in 1945.

References

External links 
 Jackie Hunt NFL Profile

1920 births
1991 deaths
American football fullbacks
American football halfbacks
Chicago Bears players
Marshall Thundering Herd football players
College Football Hall of Fame inductees
Sportspeople from Huntington, West Virginia
Players of American football from West Virginia